Waitākere Ranges is a local government area in Auckland, in New Zealand's Auckland Region, governed by the Waitākere Ranges Local Board and Auckland Council. It currently aligns with the council's Waitākere Ward.

Geography

The Waitākere Ranges local board area includes the Waitākere Ranges and surrounds. Laingholm, Waima, Titirangi, Oratia, Glen Eden and Sunnyvale are located to the east of the ranges. Henderson Valley, Waitakere, Swanson are located to the north. Bethells Beach, Piha and Whatipu are located on the West Coast.

The ranges are covered with mostly regenerating rainforest, and has habitats for a range of native flora and fauna including kauri snails, glowworms and long-tailed bats.

Features

Hoani Waititi Marae in Parrs Park is an important meeting place for urban Māori.

Waikumete Cemetery in Glen Eden is the largest cemetery in New Zealand, and includes burial areas for urban Māori and people of the Jewish faith.

Titirangi, Glen Eden and Swanson are the major retail centres in the local board area.

References

 
West Auckland, New Zealand